The 1908 Tour de France was the 6th edition of Tour de France, one of cycling's Grand Tours. The Tour began in Paris on 13 July and Stage 8 occurred on 27 July with a flat stage from Nîmes. The race finished in Paris on 9 August.

Stage 8
27 July 1908 — Nîmes to Toulouse,

Stage 9
29 July 1908 — Toulouse to Bayonne,

Stage 10
31 July 1908 — Bayonne to Bordeaux,

Stage 11
2 August 1908 — Bordeaux to Nantes,

Stage 12
4 August 1908 — Nantes to Brest,

Stage 13
6 August 1908 — Brest to Caen,

Stage 14
9 August 1908 — Caen to Paris,

References

1908 Tour de France
Tour de France stages